Diaphanomyia is a genus of bristle flies in the family Tachinidae. There are at least three described species in Diaphanomyia.

Species
These three species belong to the genus Diaphanomyia:
 Diaphanomyia aurea Townsend, 1917 c g
 Diaphanomyia aurifacies (Robineau-Desvoidy, 1830) c g
 Diaphanomyia ludens (Walker, 1860) c g
Data sources: i = ITIS, c = Catalogue of Life, g = GBIF, b = Bugguide.net

References

Further reading

External links

 
 

Tachinidae